Lance Rozeboom (born May 31, 1989) is an American soccer player.

Career

College and Amateur
Rozeboom spent his entire college career at the University of New Mexico.  In his freshman year in 2008, he made 16 appearances for the Lobos, but didn't record a goal or an assist that year.  In 2009, he made started all 20 games for the Lobos and finished with a goal and an assist each.  His lone goal came in the first round of the 2009 NCAA College Cup against the University of Portland.  Unfortunately, New Mexico would end up losing that match 2–1 in extra time.  Rozeboom went on to be named Second team All-Mountain Pacific Sports Federation, Academic All-MPSF and ESPN the Magazine Academic All-District VI First Team in 2009.  In 2010, he started all 20 games for the Lobos and finished with two goals and two assists on his way to being named First Team All-MPSF and Third Team All-West.  In 2011, he started all 22 games and finished with three goals and two assists on his way to being named First-Team All-MPSF, First-Team All-Far West and was named to Top Drawer Soccer's Top 100 list (No. 37).

Rozeboom also played three years with Des Moines Menace in the USL Premier Development League.

Professional
On January 17, 2012, Rozeboom was drafted in the second round (26th overall) of the 2012 MLS Supplemental Draft by D.C. United.  After an impressive preseason, he signed a professional contract with the club on March 7.  On March 23, Rozeboom suffered a Torn ACL during training and was ruled out for the rest of the season.  He was released from the club on February 27, 2013, without making a single appearance for the club.

On March 20, 2013, Rozeboom joined USL Pro club Rochester Rhinos for the 2013 season.  He made his professional debut on April 13 in a 3–0 defeat to VSI Tampa Bay FC.

On November 17, 2014, it was announced Rozeboom have moved to new USL Pro franchise Austin Aztex.

On December 18, 2015, Rozeboom and fellow Austin teammate Fernando Timbó were signed by Ottawa Fury FC of the North American Soccer League. He was re-signed for the 2017 season as the team jumped to the United Soccer League and latter named the third captain in team history.

Rozeboom signed with fellow USL club Tampa Bay Rowdies on January 8, 2018.

Career statistics

References

External links
New Mexico Lobos bio

1989 births
Living people
American soccer players
Association football midfielders
Austin Aztex players
D.C. United draft picks
D.C. United players
Des Moines Menace players
Expatriate soccer players in Canada
Miami FC players
New Mexico Lobos men's soccer players
North American Soccer League players
Ottawa Fury FC players
People from Linn County, Iowa
Rochester New York FC players
Soccer players from Iowa
Tampa Bay Rowdies players
USL Championship players
USL League Two players
National Independent Soccer Association players